"Dumb Love" is a song by British singer and songwriter Mimi Webb, from her debut EP, Seven Shades of Heartbreak. It was released on 11 June 2021, through Epic Records. The song debuted at its peak of number 12 on the UK Singles Chart dated 18 June 2021. It received certifications in three countries, including being certified silver in the UK.

Writing and inspiration
Taken from Seven Shades of Heartbreak which as a collection of songs, according to Harper's Bazaar, "narrates the stages of healing", the song itself "also lays out the nuances of lyrical heartbreak".

Webb said about the EP "I wanted to create around different feelings and the idea of explaining my seven stages. The song "Dumb Love" was that part of the EP where it was great. [At that point,] everything was lovely, fresh, and new. It was nostalgic because you were going back into a situation you had not visited for a long time. Yeah, "Dumb Love" was definitely an exciting part because it was much more lighthearted and loving than other songs."

Charts

Certifications

References

2021 songs
2021 singles
Epic Records singles
Mimi Webb songs